Theban Tomb TT2 is located in Deir el-Medina, part of the Theban Necropolis, on the west bank of the Nile, opposite to Luxor. It is the burial place of the ancient Egyptian official, Khabekhnet, and his family.  Khabekhnet was Servant in the Place of Truth, during the reign of Ramesses II.

Khabekhnet was the son of Sennedjem (TT1) and Iyneferti. His family is mentioned in the tomb.

Courts

Several stelae appear in the court. One depicts Khabekhnet and his father Sennedjem kneeling. The text includes hymns to Ra. Another stela shows the barque of Re adored by baboons, while in another register Khabekhnet's father and family appear before Horus and Satet. Yet another register depicts Khabekhnet and his wife Sahte before Ahmose I and Queen Ahmose-Nefertari.

Hall

The hall is decorated with scenes showing Khabekhnet and family before deities and funerary scenes. Father Sennedjem kneels before the god Min and a goddess. Khons and his wife are shown making an offering to Senendjem and Iyneferti. Khabekhnet offers candles to Min and Isis.

Another wall shows ceremonies in the Temple of Mut at Karnak; these scenes include images of barques and criosphinxes. Another register shows a pilgrimage to Abydos. A weighing scene shows Khabekhnet's brother Khonsu being led by Harsiese and Khonsu's wife by Anubis and a funeral procession accompanied by male mourners.

In four other registers Sennedjem and relatives adore the Hathor-cow within a shrine, people part-take in a banquet, and the last register shows a funeral procession.

The scene showing Khabekhnet offering before two rows of Kings and Queens is now in the Berlin Museum (1625). 
Upper part: The cartouches list (from right to left) Djeserkare (Amenhotep I), Ahmose-Nefertari, Seqenenre Tao, Ahhotep, king's sister Meritamun, a king's sister, mother of the god Kaesmut, king's sister Sitamun, a king's son (name lost), Royal Lady (name lost), Great king's wife Henuttamehu, king's wife Tures, king's wife Ahmose, king's son Sipair.

Lower part: Khabekhnet offers before Nebhepetre Mentuhotep (II), Nebpehtyre Ahmose, King Sekhentnebre, Wadjkheperre Kamose, a king's son Binpu, king's son Wadjmose, king's son Ramose,  king's son Nebenkhurru (?), king's son Ahmose, God's wife Kamose, a god's wife Sit-ir-bau, a god's wife Ta-khered-qa, a god's wife (name lost).

See also
 List of Theban tombs

References

Buildings and structures completed in the 13th century BC
Theban tombs